Alessandra Mussolini (born 30 December 1962) is an Italian politician, the granddaughter of Benito Mussolini, and a former actress and model who served as a Member of the European Parliament for Forza Italia. In 2004, she became the first woman to lead a political party in Italy. She was a member of the Chamber of Deputies from 2008 to 2013 and the Italian Senate from 2013 to 2014, she was elected under The People of Freedom which is now part of Forza Italia. She was elected to the European Parliament in 2014.

She was the founder and leader of the national conservative political party Social Action; from 2004 until 2008, Mussolini also served as a Member of the European Parliament, and she has been a member of the Chamber of Deputies, the lower house of the Italian Parliament, for The People of Freedom. 

Mussolini left politics, temporarily, in December 2020 for a new television career, but in November 2022 she returned as MEP, succeeding Antonio Tajani, after his election to the Chamber of Deputies.

Personal life
Alessandra Mussolini was born in Rome, the daughter of Romano Mussolini, the fourth son of Benito Mussolini, fascist dictator of Italy from 1922 to 1943, and Anna Maria Villani Scicolone (born 11 May 1938, Rome). Actress Sophia Loren is her maternal aunt.

From 1976 to 1980 she went to high school at the American Overseas School of Rome. She graduated in 1994 from Sapienza University of Rome, where she got her Master of Science in medicine and surgery.

She married customs policeman Mauro Floriani on 28 October 1989. Contrary to tradition, she proposed to him. Together they have three children, Caterina, Clarissa, and Romano — the last named after his grandfather. Later, the children adopted their mother's surname, but she went through a complex legal process to allow them to do so. She has since campaigned for Italian law to be changed to allow all children to take their mother's last name if they wish.

Her husband was one of the accused scheduled to appear in court for a child prostitution trial in 2015. In 2013, around 50 men—among them celebrities, professionals, priests, journalists and politicians—were accused of paying two teenage girls, aged 14 and 15, for sexual services in Rome.

She is first cousin once-removed to Caio Giulio Cesare Mussolini, Benito Mussolini's great-grandson, who ran for the Fratelli d’Italia party in the 2019 European Parliament election. She considers herself Roman Catholic, although she does not attend Mass regularly.

In 2001, Mussolini was involved in an altercation while filming for a Porta a Porta talk show episode on sexual harassment. She was verbally accosted by Katia Bellillo, then Minister for Equal Opportunities, who got up and approached Mussolini. In response Mussolini verbally and physically attacked Bellillo, calling her an "ugly communist" who should "go and live in Cuba."

She has been a painter since 2014 and her first "mostra personale" was held during 2015 in Rome.

Entertainment career
Mussolini was taken under the wing of her aunt Sophia Loren for a while and started a career as an actress in the Italian film industry during the 1970s. A Special Day (1977), in which she had a minor role as "Maria Luisa," won an American Golden Globe Award for Best Foreign Language Film and was nominated for an Academy Award for Best Foreign Language Film.

During 1982, Mussolini released a pop music album of romantic songs under the title Amore on Alfa Records; the album was released only in Japan and has since become something of a collectors item.

Mussolini also appeared as a glamour model, including on the cover of two European editions of Playboy, in Italy (August 1983) and Germany (November 1983). "When you are an actress, you are dealing with the body. Every actress does topless and stuff like this; you have to," she has said.

Mussolini continued as an actress into the 1980s. Some of the films she featured in were made for Italian television. However, she still acted in standard cinematic films, such as The Assisi Underground in which she played a nun; the movie focused on the Roman Catholic Church rescuing Italian Jews from the Nazis in 1943. She starred in her final film in 1990 and then left the film industry to continue studying after a producer asked her to change her name.

Political career

Italian Parliament
In 1992, Alessandra Mussolini was elected to parliament in a Naples constituency as a member of the Movimento Sociale Italiano (MSI).
After the Italian general elections of April 2008, Mussolini served as a member of the Italian parliament within Silvio Berlusconi's alliance of right wing parties, The People of Freedom.

In the Italian general election of February 2013, she was elected to the Senate of the Republic as a member of The People of Freedom. The party was transformed into a new Forza Italia in November 2013. In the 2014 European Parliament election, Mussolini was elected to the EP for Forza Italia.

Mayoral candidate
Mussolini was  a candidate for the post of mayor of Naples, but was defeated by Antonio Bassolino. She claimed that her relations with Gianfranco Fini, leader of the Alleanza Nazionale, never were very good; she then later withdrew, resigning over differences with him at least once. She unsuccessfully challenged him for the leadership of the party when he withdrew support for Mussolini in a television interview in January 2002.

Formation of Social Action
Mussolini suddenly left the National Alliance on 28 November 2003, following the visit of party leader and the Deputy Prime Minister Gianfranco Fini to Israel, where he described fascism as part "the absolute evil" with regard to the Holocaust as he apologised for Italy's role as an Axis Power during the Second World War. Mussolini, however, defended the right of Israel to exist and declared that the world "should beg forgiveness of Israel."

Following her resignation, Mussolini formed her Social Action party, originally named "Freedom of Action," and organised a coalition named Social Alternative. This made her the first female leader of an Italian political party. The move was read in the Italian media as surprising because of Mussolini's "progressive" stances on many issues, including abortion, artificial insemination, gay rights and civil unions. She has been an outspoken feminist and has been described by conservative commentators as a "socialist" and a "left-winger."

European Parliament
In the 2004 European Parliament election, Social Alternative, gained 1.2% of the electoral list vote. Mussolini herself received 133,000 preference votes.

In response to a comment made by UKIP MEP Godfrey Bloom in which he said that "No self-respecting small businessman with a brain in the right place would ever employ a lady of child-bearing age. That isn't politically correct, is it, but it's a fact of life. The more women's rights you have, it's actually a bar to their employment." and: "I just don't think [women] clean behind the fridge enough," Mussolini responded by saying 

In March 2005, Mussolini was banned by a local court from regional elections held the following month for presenting fraudulent signatures. "This is an affront to democracy, if they're going to exclude the Social Alternative they will have to exclude all the parties, because all the signature lists are false," Mussolini told Reuters. Mussolini went on a hunger strike to protest the decision. However, at the end of the month Italy's top administrative court, the Council of State, annulled the decision and she stood for election.

In November 2007, remarks by Mussolini triggered the collapse of the far-right Identity, Tradition, Sovereignty grouping within the European Parliament. Mussolini declared that all Romanians were criminals in remarks regarding immigration policy. This prompted delegates from the Greater Romania Party to quit the group, bringing the group below the minimum number of members to qualify as a caucus and receive Parliamentary funding. In the 2019 European Parliament election, she lost her bid for re-election to the European Parliament.

Views on social issues
In 2006, she responded to claims by the transgender Italian parliamentary candidate Vladimir Luxuria that she was a "fascist" by saying that it would be better to be a fascist than it would be to be gay.

In 2010, Mussolini condemned the Vatican's comparison of homosexuality with paedophilia, stating "You can't link sexual orientation to pedophilia … this link risks becoming dangerously misleading for the protection of children."

Her stance on homosexuality changed consistently from the late 2010s, leading to her support for the anti-homophobia "Zan bill" and her refusal to provide her gender information on her MEP identity card after returning to the European Parliament in 2022.

End of political career
She left Forza Italia in 2018, following the party's decision to be in opposition to the Conte government. She has used Twitter to defend the memory of her grandfather from critics such as actor Jim Carrey, and fans of Scottish football club Celtic F.C.

In December 2020, she left politics for a new television career. She took part, as contestant, in Milly Carlucci's Ballando con le stelle and in Carlo Conti's Tale e quale show obtaining success.

Return to politics 
In November 2022, Mussolini returned to politics to replace Antonio Tajani as a Forza Italia MEP after his election to the Chamber of Deputies.

Filmography

Notes and references

External links

 Profile on the Italian Parliament website
 
 Interview with Alessandra Mussolini by Antonella Ricciardi, 19 May 2005
 Audio interview with Alessandra Mussolini from the Canadian Broadcasting Corporation, 30 March 2006 (RAM format)

 

1962 births
Living people
Actresses from Rome
Deputies of Legislature XI of Italy
Deputies of Legislature XII of Italy
Deputies of Legislature XIII of Italy
Deputies of Legislature XIV of Italy
Deputies of Legislature XVI of Italy
Far-right politics in Italy
Forza Italia (2013) senators
Forza Italia MEPs
Italian actor-politicians
Italian film actresses
Italian Social Movement politicians
J-pop singers
MEPs for Italy 2004–2009
MEPs for Italy 2014–2019
21st-century women MEPs for Italy
Alessandra
National Alliance (Italy) politicians
Social Alternative MEPs
The People of Freedom politicians
20th-century Italian women
Italian Roman Catholics
21st-century Italian women politicians
Women members of the Chamber of Deputies (Italy)
Women members of the Senate of the Republic (Italy)